The 2006–07 Second Division season is the twelfth season of the Scottish Second Division in its current format of ten teams.

Greenock Morton were promoted to the First Division as League champions. Stirling Albion, Raith Rovers and Brechin City enter the promotion/relegation playoffs for a place in the First Division along with Airdrie United who finished second bottom of the First Division.

Forfar Athletic were relegated to the Third Division while Stranraer enter the promotion/relegation playoffs with the second, third and fourth placed teams of the Third Division - Arbroath, Queen's Park and East Fife respectively.

Promotion and Relegation from 2005–06

First & Second Divisions
Relegated from First Division to Second Division
 Brechin City
 Stranraer (via play-offs)

Promoted from Second Division to First Division
 Gretna
 Partick Thistle (via play-offs)

Second & Third Divisions
Relegated from Second Division to Third Division
 Dumbarton
Promoted from Third Division to Second Division
 Cowdenbeath

Table

Top scorers

Attendances
The average attendances for Second Division clubs for season 2006/07 are shown below:

Second Division play-offs

Semi-finals
The ninth placed team in the Second Division played the fourth placed team in the Third Division and third placed team in the Second Division played the second placed team in the Second Division. The play-offs were played over two legs, the winning team in each semi-final advanced to the final.

|}

First legs

Second legs

Final
The two semi-final winners played each other over two legs. The winning team was awarded a place in the 2008–09 Second Division.

|}

First leg

Second leg

Queen's Park were promoted to the Second Division

Scottish Second Division seasons
2006–07 Scottish Football League
3
Scot